Barrymooreana quadrimaculata is a species of beetle in the family Carabidae, the only species in the genus Barrymooreana.

References

Lebiinae